The Amman Bus is a bus service operated in Amman, Jordan since 2019.

It is currently consisting of 135 buses throughout around 27 routes. Bus tickets can be bought either online via the Amman Bus mobile application or as a rechargeable card in major terminals. Passengers scan their cards or QR codes on phone when boarding the bus, where the price ticket is subtracted from the available balance. The buses are air-conditioned, accessible, monitored with security cameras and have free internet service. In 2019, the Amman Bus transported 2.7 million passengers.

Routes

See also
 Amman Bus Rapid Transit

References

Transport in Amman